James McNamara may refer to:

 James A. McNamara, American orthodontist
 James McNamara (politician), member of the South Dakota State Senate, 1927–1929
 James McNamara (athlete) (1939–2016), Irish Olympic athlete
 James B. McNamara, one of the McNamara brothers who pleaded guilty to the 1910 bombing of the Los Angeles Times building
 James McNamara, San Francisco seamster and one of the designers of the LGBT pride flag

See also
 James Macnamara (1768–1826), Royal Navy officer